Al-Dawayima, Dawaymeh or Dawayma was a Palestinian town, located in the former Hebron Subdistrict of Mandatory Palestine, and in what is now the Lakhish region, some 15 kilometres south-east of Kiryat Gat.

According to a 1945 census, the town's population was 3,710, and the village lands comprised a total land area of 60,585 dunums of which nearly half was cultivable. The population figures for this town also included the populations of nearby khirbets, or ancient villages. During the 1948 Palestine war, the al-Dawayima massacre occurred. According to Saleh Abd al-Jawad an estimated 80-200 civilian men, women and children were killed. According to John Bagot Glubb, a UN report said that 30 women and children were killed.

In 1955, the ruins of the town were replaced by the Israeli moshav of Amatzia.

History
It has been occasionally identified with the Old Testament town of Bosqat, the home of Josiah's mother Jedidah (2 Kings, 22:1) though the association has not found widespread acceptance.

Al-Dawayima's historical remains encompass a long period from the Bronze Age, through to the Persian and Hellenistic, down to the Ottoman period. Bulldozing what remains of the Palestinian village to prepare a new Israeli village has revealed an ancient olive press, a columbarium cave,  a villa from the Second Temple era, and both mikvehs and cisterns.

The "core clan" of Al-Dawayima were the Ahdibs, who traced their origin to the Muslim conquest and settlement of Palestine in the seventh century.

Ottoman era
In the late Ottoman era, in May, 1838, Edward Robinson visited during harvesting time. He noted that Al-Dawayima  was situated on a hill, with a view of several villages to the east. During the harvest, several Christians  from Beit Jala were employed here as labourers; the barley harvest was coming to an end, while the wheat harvest was just beginning. He further noted it  as a Muslim village, between the mountains and Gaza, but subject to the government of el-Khulil.

In 1863  Victor Guérin  visited twice, and he estimated  that the village contained 900 inhabitants, while an  Ottoman village list from about 1870 found that Dawaime had  only a population of 85, in a total of  34  houses, though the population count included men, only.

In 1883, the PEF's Survey of Western Palestine described al-Dawayima  as a village on a high stony ridge that had olive groves beneath it. On a higher ridge to the west stood a shrine that was topped by a white stone.

The people of al-Dawayima were Muslims. They maintained several religious shrines, chief among them the shrine of Shaykh ´Ali. This shrine had a large courtyard, a number of rooms, and one large hall for prayers, and was surrounded by fig and carob trees and cactuses. It attracted visitors from the neighboring villages. A mosque was located in the village center, it was maintained by the followers of al-tariqa  al-khalwatiyya, a Sufi mystic order founded by Shaykh Umar al-Khalwati (d.1397)

British  Mandate era
In the 1922 census of Palestine conducted  by the British Mandate authorities, AI Dawaima had a population of 2,441 inhabitants, all Muslims, increasing in  the 1931 census to 2,688, still all Muslim, in a total of  559 houses.

The villagers expanded and renovated the village mosque in the 1930s, and added a tall minaret.

In the   1945 statistics, Al-Dawayima  had a population of 3,710 Muslims, with  a total land area of 60.585 dunums of land.
By 1944/45, 21,191 dunums of village land were allotted to cereals, 1,206 dunums were irrigated or used for orchards,  while 179  dunams were built-up (urban) areas.

1948 war and aftermath

Al-Dawaymima was captured by Israel's Eighty Ninth Battalion (commanded by Dov Chesis) of the 8th Armored Brigade led by the founder of the Palmach, Yitzhak Sadeh, after Operation Yoav on 29 October 1948, five days after the start of the truce. It was the site of the al-Dawayima massacre in which 80–200 civilians were killed, including women and children. According to Lieutenant-General John Bagot Glubb, a British officer stationed with Jordanian's Arab Legion in Bethlehem and Hebron at that time, the massacre was calculated to drive out the villagers and had been reported by UN observers to involve 30 deaths. The massacre was cited by Yigal Allon as the reason for the halting of the creeping annexation that included Bayt Jibrin, Qubeiba and Tel Maresha. It was also seen as a reprisal by the Israelis for the massacre of Jews in Kfar Etzion months before, on May 13, 1948, by Palestinian fighters and some members of the Arab Legion.

The moshav of Amatzia was established in 1955 on land that had belonged to Al-Dawayima. According to the Palestinian historian Walid Khalidi :"The site has been fenced in. A cowshed, a chicken coop, and granaries have been built at its center (which has been leveled). The southern side of the site contains stone terraces and the remnants of a house. The eastern side is occupied by the residential area of the moshav."

In 2013, the whole area, apart from some ancient Jewish remains, was bulldozed to pave the way for the erection of a new community called Karmei Katif, which was completed in 2016 and which houses evacuees of the Gaza Strip settlements. The new name is reminiscent of Gush Katif.

Culture
A woman's thob (loose fitting robe with sleeves) dated to about 1910 that was produced in Al-Dawayima is part of the Museum of International Folk Art (MOIFA) collection at Santa Fe. The dress is of hand-woven blue indigo linen. The embroidery is in predominantly red silk cross-stitch, with touches of violet, orange, yellow, white, green and black. The upper half of the qabbeh (the square chest panel) is embroidered with alternating columns of diamonds, (a pattern known as el-ferraneh), and eight-pointed stars, (called qamr ("moons")). The lower half of the qabbeh is in the qelayed ("necklaces") pattern. The side-panels of the skirt are completely covered with embroidered columns. Among the patterns used here are: nakhleh ("palm") motif, ward-wil-aleq ("rose-and-leech") and khem-el-basha ("the pashas tent"). Each column is topped with various trees. There is no embroidery on the long, pointed sleeves.

The village is often featured in the works of Palestinian artist Abdul Hay Mosallam who was expelled from it in 1948.

By 2011, two books about the village history had been published.

In popular culture
In the 2008 film Salt of this Sea, Al-Dawayima is the village which Emad, the male protagonist, hails from.  The village ruins serve as the temporary residence of the main characters, Emad and Soraya.  The film is dedicated to the memory of the Al-Dawayima massacre.

Families 
Lafi
Sanwar (سنور)
Abd al-dean (عبد الدين)
Abu Subaih (أبوصبيح)
Abu-Farwa (ابوفروه)
Abu-Galyeh (أبوغالية)
Abu-Galyoun (أبو غليون)
Abu-Halemah(أبوحليمة)
Abu-Haltam (أبو حلتم)
Abu-Kadra (أبو خضرة)
Abu-Matr (أبو مطر)
Abu-Me'alish (أبومعيلش)
Abu-Rahma (ابورحمة)
Abu-Rayan (أبو ريان)
Abu-Safyeh (أبو صفية)
Abu-Sugair (أبو صقير)
Afaneh (عفانه)
Al-Absi (العبسي)
Al-Adarbeh (العداربة)
Al-Aqtash (القطيشات)
Al-Atrash (الأطرش)
Al-Ayaseh (العيسه)
Al-Hijouj (الحجوج)
Al-Jamarah (الجمرة)
Al-Jawawdeh (الجواودة)
Al-Kateeb (الخطيب)
Al-Khodour(الخضور)
Al-Maqusi(المقوسي)
Al-Mallad (الملاد)
Al-Manasra (المناصرة)
Al-Najaar (النجار)
Al-Qaisieh (القيسيه)
Al-Sabateen(السباتين)
Al-Turk (الترك)
Al-Zaatreh (الزعاترة)
Asha (عشا)
Basbous(بصبوص)
Ead (عيد)
El-Ghawanmeh (الغوانمه)
Ganem (غانم)
Hamdan (حمدان)
Harb (حرب)
Hudaib (هديب)
Hunaif (حنيف)
Ms'ed (مسعد)
Nashwan (نشوان)
Sa'adeh (سعادة)
Shahin (شاهين)
Sundoqa (صندوقه)
Zebin (زبن)

Famous residents 

 Musa Hadeib

See also
 Abdul Hay Mosallam Zarara
 Depopulated Palestinian locations in Israel
 List of villages depopulated during the Arab-Israeli conflict
 Killings and Massacres During the 1948 Israel/Palestine War
 al-Dawayima massacre
 Palestinian costumes

References

Bibliography

 

 
 

 
Glassé, Cyril (1989): The Concise Encyclopedia of Islam. San Francisco: Harper & Row Cited in Khalidi.
 
 
  

 
Hudayb, Musa (1985): Qaryat al-Dawayima (The village of al-Dawayima). Amman: Dar al-jalil li al-nashr. Cited in Khalidi.
 
  

 
 
 

 
 
 
  (A catalog of the  Museum of International Folk Art (MOIFA) at Santa Fe's  collection of Palestinian clothing and jewelry.)

External links
Welcome to al-Dawayima
al-Dawayima, Zochrot
Survey of Western Palestine, Map 20:   IAA, Wikimedia commons 
al-Dawayima at Khalil Sakakini Cultural Center

Arab villages depopulated during the 1948 Arab–Israeli War
District of Hebron
Ancient Jewish settlements of Judaea